Sabrina Matthews (born 1977) is a Canadian ballet choreographer. She has created pieces for some of the most prestigious ballet companies in the world, including multiple pieces for the renowned Stuttgart Ballet.  This in-demand choreographer has premiered works on three continents in over a dozen cities from Beijing, to New York, to London.  She was recognized as one of Canada's Amazing Women to Watch,  alongside Oscar nominees.  Recently, Sabrina Matthews has received commissions from Stuttgart Ballet, Royal Swedish Ballet, Boston Ballet, England's Royal Academy of Dance's Genee International Ballet Competition, and the National Ballet of Canada.  Over the past few years, her works have been performed by major international ballet companies in Canada, the United States, Spain, Sweden, Germany, Italy and the Netherlands.

Biography 

Sabrina Matthews is a Toronto native and a graduate of the National Ballet School of Canada, attending from 1987 to 1995.  From 1995 to 2005, she was a leading soloist and aspiring choreographer with Alberta Ballet under artistic directors Mikko Nissinen and Jean Grand-Maitre.  Sabrina Matthews danced on four different continents, including several tours all throughout China.  Her choreography and dance films have been recognized with several national and international awards, including: the 2008 PACE Award from the Government of Canada (Alberta) as an Outstanding Alumnus of the Banff Centre; a 2006 Ballet VIP Honorable Mention from Pointe Magazine; the 1995 Peter Dwyer award for excellence in dance; the 2005 Clifford E. Lee Choreography Award from the Banff Centre; and a nomination for a 2003 dance film award from the Alberta Motion Picture Industries Association for “Dance to This” 2002, a Bravo!FACT Film.

After creating five pieces for Alberta Ballet  and a piece for The New York Choreographic Institute on the School of American Ballet. Stuttgart Ballet Artistic Director Reid Anderson invited Sabrina Matthews to attend the Noverre Society in 2006.  While there, she created soles, which earned rave reviews among the German critics.  It was included as part of Stuttgart Ballet's repertoire and was reprised during Stuttgart's December Gala. Her “triumph in Europe” led to commissions from some of the world's most pre-eminent ballet companies. Shortly thereafter, she ended her dance career early and pursued choreography full-time.

Since that time, she has created three pieces for the National Ballet of Canada and a second piece for Stuttgart Ballet, all of which have been reprised.  In 2008, Sabrina Matthews created a piece for England's Royal Academy of Dance's 2008 Genee International Ballet Competition.  She also created a new piece, quondam in 2008 for the Royal Swedish Ballet, which has since been reprised in 2009 and 2010.   Sabrina Matthews made her U.S. debut in March 2008 with ein von viel at Boston Ballet to high critical praise.  To date, ein von viel has been performed by three different companies for a total of eight reprisals in four different countries and eleven different cities.

In addition to working with major international ballet companies, Sabrina Matthews continues to work closely with her alma mater, Canada's National Ballet School, has choreographed a figure skating solo for four-time world figure-skating champion Kurt Browning, and works for television in North America  and Europe, including choreography for the television dance competition So You Think You Can Dance Canada.

Choreographed work 
(all pieces world premieres unless otherwise indicated)

For the Stuttgart Ballet

 soles (2006)
 veil (May 4, 2008)

For the Royal Swedish Ballet

 quondam (November 7, 2008)

For the Boston Ballet

 ein von viel (March 6–9, 2008 - U.S. Premiere)

For the National Ballet of Canada

 clearing (2007)
 veer (2008 - originally commissioned for the Erik Bruhn Competition 2007)
 DEXTRIS (March, 2009)
 In Peril (February, 2011 - premiered at Stuttgart Ballet's 50th Anniversary Gala)

For the National Ballet School (Canada)

 Sequentia (May, 2009)

For the Alberta Ballet

 delude (2000)
 ein von viel (2001)
 transience (2002)
 unbound (2003)
 fallen arm (2004)
 losing ground (2005)

For competitions and festivals

Dance to This (2001 Bravo!FACT Film - 2002 Calgary International Film Festival; 2003 Brooklyn International Film Festival; and London, U.K.'s Constellation Change Screen Dance Festival 2005)
 unbound (2001 Beijing International Dance Festival)
 Rodin (2005 Glenbow Museum)
 veer (2007 Erik Bruhn Competition - however, not performed due to dancer injury)
 clearing (2007 Canada Day Celebration in Ottawa, Canada - reprise)
 monas (August, 2008 Genee International Ballet Competition)

Awards
 1994 Peter Dwyer Award (Canada Council for the Arts/National Ballet School - excellence in dance)
 2003 Alberta Motion Picture Industries Association (nomination) (for Dance to This)
 2005 Clifford E. Lee Award (Banff Centre for the Arts - choreography award)
 2008 Alberta Provincial Awards Celebrating Excellence - Outstanding Alumnus Award regarding her tenure at the Banff Centre)

Reviews 
 Reid Anderson, artistic director of the Stuttgart Ballet, May 2006:
"Sabrina is an excellent Canadian cultural ambassador for Canada. The dancers loved working with her, the German audience deeply connected with her ballet and she inspired everyone here during the process. She has successfully pierced the highly competitive European market".

 Karen Campbell, in the Boston Globe, March 8, 2008:
"Surprisingly, the most effective work on the program was also the smallest, the duet "ein von viel," marking the US debut of Canadian choreographer Sabrina Matthews. Set to selections from Bach's exquisite "Goldberg" Variations (given a stellar performance onstage by pianist Freda Locker), it was commissioned by Nissinen while he was artistic director of Alberta Ballet, and it's a beauty. Friday night, John Lam and James Whiteside were dazzling in Matthews's virtuosic choreography. Matthews matches the clarity of Bach's score while consciously subverting the elegance with bits of "you lookin‘ at me?" attitude and quirky nuances. Dynamics shift with quicksilver speed, long lines dissolve into squiggles, complemented by playful gestures – feet that paw the ground, hands that cover the face, backward runs. But it‘s all fairly subtle, cast in phrases of tensile fluidity from which erupt brilliant leaps and turns in vivid asymmetric shapes."

 Gabriele Müller, in Stuttgarter Zeitung, May 22, 2006:
"The exceptional ballerina Alicia Amatriain is partnered by Evan McKie in Sabrina Matthew's piece soles set to spiritual vocal music by Tomas Luis de Victoria. This pas de deux of continuous movement conveys an impression of eternity. Pain, suffering and longing are expressed as a fulfillment.

 Denise Sum, Ballet Dance Magazine, August, 2007:
"The following work, also by a young Canadian, succeeded where Robinson's did not. National Ballet School alumnus and former Alberta Ballet member Sabrina Matthews’ “clearing” has direction and form. The work, set to Mozart's powerful Great Mass in C Minor, has three couples moving through patterns of movement like the many voices of a fugue. Bridgett Zehr was particularly stunning, her pas de deux with Piotr Stanczyk almost spiritual. Stacey Shiori Minagawa and Chris Body plus Greta Hodgkinson and Nehemiah Kish rounded out this strong cast. Near the end of the ballet, the black backdrop is lifted, ever so slowly. The white background behind it “grows”, the way light fills a room. The dancers turn to face the back, in some sort of reverent or ceremonial action, as the curtain falls."

 Bob Clark, in the  Calgary Herald, July 15, 2005:
"For her new creation, Matthews too has chosen carefully, building the emotional intensity of the work, losing ground, through a combination of complex passionate movement and a slow luminous score. The score is fashioned from the music of Thomas Tallis, Brahms and J.S. Bach, with important contributions from Calgary soundscape artist Dewi Wood.
Massively framed by set designer Scott Reid’s evocation of vertical steel plates and dramatically lit by lighting designer Harry Frehner, losing ground’s eight characters seem to be in a state of alert as they try to connect and re-connect – bodies bending then arching back, arms spreading in both supplicating and questioning gestures – to find their way back from loneliness and isolation. The powerful work was performed beautifully by the dancers, led by Tara Williamson and Daniel Marshalsay. The standing ovation from the large crowd was richly deserved by all concerned.".

 Salena McDougall in SEE Magazine, April 3, 2003
""Alberta Ballet’s Sabrina Christine Matthews is being outrageously understated when she describes the past dance season as "one of the biggest years" for her.  In her eighth year with the company, Matthews was blazing at the forefront ... "It has been exciting, and a whole lot of work," Matthews says reflecting on a breakthrough season.

Not only is this ballerina's career on a roll, she's well on her way to making a name for herself as a dance-maker. Just last February, Matthews was in the Big Apple, invited by the New York Choreographic Institute to workshop her own choreography on dancers from the School of American Ballet. And she recently added video star to her resume with Dance to This, a short Bravo! film of her own creation.

 Jean Grand-Maître, artistic director of the Alberta Ballet, May 2006:
"Many of the most respected and cutting edge choreographers working today have had their beginning during the Noverre series of the Stuttgart Ballet and Ms. Matthews’ success will bid well for her future career as a dance creator in Europe".

References

External links 

 Sabrina Matthews' Webpage
 National Ballet of Canada
 Alberta Ballet
 Genee Ballet Competition
 Stuttgart Ballet
 New York Choreographic Institute
 Pointe Magazine

Ballet choreographers
Canadian choreographers
Canadian ballerinas
Canadian female dancers
Living people
1977 births
So You Think You Can Dance choreographers
So You Think You Can Dance Canada
Participants in Canadian reality television series
Canadian women choreographers